Ibrahim Al-Shoeil (born 21 November 1994) is a Saudi Arabian football player who currently plays as a left back for Al-Qadisiyah.

References

External links
 

Living people
1994 births
Saudi Arabian footballers
Al-Qadsiah FC players
Saudi Professional League players
Saudi First Division League players
Association football fullbacks